The Northumberland Women's cricket team is the women's representative cricket team for the English historic county of Northumberland. They played their home games at Stocksfield Cricket Club Ground, Stocksfield. They competed in the Women's County Championship from 1998 to 2019 and in the Women's Twenty20 Cup from 2009 to 2018. In 2020, it was announced that Northumberland was merging its team with Durham, becoming North East Warriors. They are partnered with the regional side Northern Diamonds.

History
Northumberland Women played their first recorded match in 1949, against Durham. They joined the national county structure in 1998, playing in the Women's County Championship Division 3, winning one out of five games. They played in the Championship for a further two years with little success, before withdrawing and only returning in 2005. Since then, Northumberland consistently played in the bottom tier of the Championship, with their best season coming in 2016, finishing 3rd in Division 4 N&E. 

In the Women's Twenty20 Cup, Northumberland performed similarly, playing in Divisions Three and Four. In 2010, they reached a Divisional Final to play for promotion, but lost to Northamptonshire. Northumberland did not compete in the 2019 tournament, but will return in 2021 as North East Warriors, a combined side with Durham.

Players

Notable players
Players who have played for Northumberland and played internationally are listed below, in order of first international appearance (given in brackets):

 Dorothy Macfarlane (1957)
 Margaret Rutherford (1960)
 Sara MacLean (2001)
 Linda Spence (2001)
 Anuradha Doddaballapur (2020)

Seasons

Women's County Championship

Women's Twenty20 Cup

See also
 Northumberland County Cricket Club
 North East Warriors
 Northern Diamonds

References

Cricket in Northumberland
Women's cricket teams in England